The Star Ferry Public Transport Interchange is a public transport interchange and bus terminal at Star Ferry Pier, Tsim Sha Tsui, along Salisbury Road, in Kowloon, Hong Kong.

External links
 

Tsim Sha Tsui
Transport in Hong Kong